Carroll Alsop House) is a historic house located at 1907 A Avenue East in Oskaloosa, Iowa.

Description and history 
It is one of seven Frank Lloyd Wright designed Usonian houses located in Iowa, and one of two that were constructed in Oskaloosa. Both were completed in 1951. This house is an L-plan, unless you count the carport, which makes it a T-plan. It was a custom-built house that embodied the ideals of "free and simple living, in touch with nature, for the family of moderate means."

The house was listed on the National Register of Historic Places on November 9, 1988.

References

 Storrer, William Allin. The Frank Lloyd Wright Companion. University Of Chicago Press, 2006,  (S.304)

External links
Frank Lloyd Wright's Carroll Alsop House in Oskaloosa, Iowa
Alsop house on dgunning.org

Houses completed in 1951
Frank Lloyd Wright buildings
Houses in Mahaska County, Iowa
Houses on the National Register of Historic Places in Iowa
National Register of Historic Places in Mahaska County, Iowa
Oskaloosa, Iowa
Modernist architecture in Iowa